Egaperumagalur  is a village in the  
Aranthangirevenue block of Pudukkottai district, Tamil Nadu, India.

Demographics 

As per the 2001 census, Egaperumagalur had a total population of  
865 with 400 males and 465 females. Out of the total population 562 people were literate.

References

Villages in Pudukkottai district